Late Night Liars is an American television game show on Game Show Network (GSN) that was under The Jim Henson Company's Henson Alternative brand and premiered on June 10, 2010. The series was hosted by Larry Miller, and stars several "celebrity" puppets, which were created by The Jim Henson Company. Each episode has two human contestants trying to figure out which of the puppets are lying, and which are telling the truth.

Characters
Five puppet characters regularly participate in the show:

In addition, the following puppets representing real-life celebrities have been panelists on certain episodes.

Gameplay

Round 1
In round 1, host Larry Miller gives a category, and the puppet panelists each give one answer. Two of the panelists are giving real answers, and the other two are lying. After all four panelists give an answer, the contestants secretly and simultaneously pick one panelist that they think is lying. If a contestant selects a liar, he or she wins a pre-stated amount of money as announced by announcer Weasel, usually in the range of $500 to $600.

Round 2
Round 2 is played the same as round 1, except that three panelists are giving true answers and one is lying. Correctly selecting the liar earns the contestant a pre-stated amount of money, usually in the range of $800 to $900, although one episode's second round was worth $797.

Round 3
In Round 3, each contestant, starting with the current leader, selects one panelist, who gives a statement relating to the category given by host Miller. The contestant must then determine if the statement is true or a lie. If the contestant correctly judges the statement, a computer randomizer (dubbed the "Randomometer") is activated, when the contestant presses a button, the reels stop, revealing a cash amount greater than $100 (the upper limit is never clearly established; however, the screen has spaces for four digits). At the end of this round, the contestant with more money wins the game and keeps the money; the losing contestant receives a consolation prize (usually a product made by Telebrands) and $500 in cash, regardless of their score. The winning contestant also plays the "Two Topic Showdown" for a larger cash prize (from $10,000 up to $25,000).

Two Topic Showdown (Bonus Round)
The two panelists that did not participate in round 3 are each assigned a subject by host Miller. They alternate giving statements, the night's winner must determine whether the statement is true or a lie when applied to that panelist's subject. For each correct response, the contestant wins $500, if the contestant gives eight correct responses within 43 seconds, he or she wins the announced grand prize amount, prior to the last break, host Miller initially announces it to be $10,000, however, Weasel occasionally interrupts him to increase or reduce the amount, usually by very little; from $9,993 (eighth aired episode) to $10,004 (fourth aired episode). Episodes with special guest puppets have had higher cash prizes of $25,000 (Rourke episode) and $20,000 (O'Donnell episode), respectively.

Later appearances
 Colleen Smith occasionally reprises Cashmere Ramada for specific Puppet Up! shows.
 Cashmere Ramada and Shelley Oceans appeared in the Neil's Puppet Dreams episode "Dream Bump." Cashmere Ramada was seen as a dancer while Shelly Oceans was seen as a drag queen (performed by Allan Trautman).

References

External links
 

2010 American television series debuts
2010 American television series endings
2010s American comedy game shows
English-language television shows
Game Show Network original programming
American television shows featuring puppetry
Television series by The Jim Henson Company